Amon Rébecca Grâce Elloh (born 25 December 1994), known as Rebecca Elloh, is an Ivorian footballer who plays as a forward for Spanish Primera División club Deportivo Alavés and the Ivory Coast women's national team. She was part of the Ivorian squad for the 2015 FIFA Women's World Cup.

See also
List of Ivory Coast women's international footballers

References

External links
Rébecca Elloh at BDFútbol
 
 Profile at FIF 

1994 births
Living people
People from Grand-Bassam
Ivorian women's footballers
Women's association football forwards
Gintra Universitetas players
Barcelona FA players
EdF Logroño players
Deportivo Alavés Gloriosas players
Primera División (women) players
Segunda Federación (women) players
Ivory Coast women's international footballers
2015 FIFA Women's World Cup players
Ivorian expatriate footballers
Ivorian expatriate sportspeople in Lithuania
Expatriate women's footballers in Lithuania
Ivorian expatriate sportspeople in Cyprus
Expatriate women's footballers in Cyprus
Ivorian expatriate sportspeople in Spain
Expatriate women's footballers in Spain